Kyu-won is a Korean unisex given name, predominantly masculine. Its meaning differs based on the hanja used to write each syllable of the name. There are 20 hanja with the reading "kyu" and 35 hanja with the reading "won" on the South Korean government's official list of hanja which may be registered for use in given names.

People with this name include:
Yi Kyu-won (1833–1901), Joseon Dynasty military official
Oh Kyu-won (born 1941), South Korean writer
Kim Kyu-won (born 1952), South Korean scientist
Kyu Won Han (born 1972), South Korean-born American baritone with an active international opera career
Lee Kyu-won (born 1989), South Korean judoka, won the world title at the age of 19 in 2009

See also
List of Korean given names

References

Korean unisex given names